Daniele Di Donato (born 21 February 1977) is an Italian football manager and a former midfielder. He is the manager of Latina.

Playing career
Di Donato, nicknamed Dido, started his professional career with Torino (then in Serie B). He is best known for having spent a total of four seasons with Palermo, being protagonist of two promotions that led the Sicilians from Serie C1 to Serie A, and being a fan favourite during his stay with the rosanero with a total of 133 appearances. He also played a Serie A season with Siena in 2005–2006. After two seasons with Arezzo of Serie B, in 2007 he signed a contract with Ascoli.

Coaching career
After retirement, Di Donato joined Modena as a youth coach. He successively accepted to become head coach of Serie D club Jesina for the 2017–18 season.

He was then named new head coach of ArzignanoChiampo, which he guided to promotion to Serie C on his first season in charge. He left the club at the end of the 2018–19 season to become manager of Arezzo. He left Arezzo at the end of the 2019–20 season.

On 30 August 2020, he was hired by Serie C club Trapani. Trapani never took the field in their scheduled games and was officially excluded from Serie C on 5 October 2020.

On 3 November 2020, he signed with Serie C club Vis Pesaro.

On 11 August 2021, he was presented as the new manager of the newly promoted Serie C club Latina.

References

External links
Career profile (from Gazzetta.it)
Career profile (from Ascoli Calcio website)

1977 births
Living people
People from Giulianova
Association football midfielders
Italian footballers
Torino F.C. players
S.S. Arezzo players
A.C.N. Siena 1904 players
A.S.D. Castel di Sangro Calcio players
Palermo F.C. players
Ascoli Calcio 1898 F.C. players
A.S. Cittadella players
Serie A players
Serie B players
Footballers from Abruzzo
Italian football managers
S.S. Arezzo managers
Serie C managers
Sportspeople from the Province of Teramo